Buettner Peak is a sharp peak rising midway along the north wall of Roos Glacier in the northwest part of the Mount Murphy massif, in Marie Byrd Land. It was mapped by the United States Geological Survey from surveys and from U.S. Navy aerial photographs, 1959–66, and named by the Advisory Committee on Antarctic Names for Robert J. Buettner (1914–75), manager of contract logistics support provided to the U.S. Antarctic program by Holmes and Narver, Inc. This work took him to Antarctica at least five times between 1969 and 1974.

References
 

Mountains of Marie Byrd Land